Panacela lewinae, or Lewin's bag shelter moth, is a moth of the family Eupterotidae. The species was first described by John Lewin in 1805. It is found in Australia from southern Queensland to southern New South Wales.

The wingspan is about 30 mm.

The caterpillars live communally in a shelter on their food plant, made of leaves joined by silk. They spend the day in this shelter and come out to feed at night. They feed on Eucalyptus, Lophostemon, Angophora and Syncarpia (including Syncarpia glomulifera) species, as well as Chamaecytisus prolifer, Pinus radiata and Exocarpus cupressiformis.

The hairs of the caterpillars can cause skin irritation (urticaria).

External links
Species info

Panacelinae
Moths described in 1805
Taxa named by John Lewin